The Ten Gladiators is a 1963 Italian film directed by Gianfranco Parolini.

Plot summary 

Roccia and a band of fellow gladiators join forces with a patrician named Glaucus Valerius to replace Nero (and his evil henchman, Tigelinus), with a new emperor: Servius Galba. During the course of this bloody struggle, the gladiators lose their mentor and trainer - Resius - and then must rescue Lidia, Resius' beautiful niece, from death on the cross.

Cast 
 Roger Browne as Glaucus Valerius
 José Greci (a.k.a. Susan Paget) as Lidia
 Dan Vadis as Roccia
 Franca Parisi (a.k.a. Margaret Taylor) as Poppea
 Gianni Rizzo as Claudius Nero
 Mimmo Palmara (aka Dick Palmer) as Tigelinus
 Ugo Sasso as Resius
 Mirko Ellis as Servius Galba
 Gianfranco Parolini as Livius Verus
 Vassili Karis as Epaphrodito
 Emilio Messina as Gladiator Leptus
 Giuseppe Mattei (aka Pino Mattei) as Gladiator Methodius
 Pietro Torrisi as Gladiator
 Aldo Canti as Gladiator
 Giancarlo Bastianoni as Gladiator
 Giuliano Dell'Ovo as Gladiator
 Gino Turini (a.k.a. John Turner) as Gladiator
 Romano Giomini as Gladiator
 Ivano Staccioli as Gladiator
 Roberto Messina as Gladiator
 Milton Reid as Bald Wrestler
 Salvatore Borghese as Milo / Minius, the Mute
 Arnaldo Fabrizio as Glaucus' Little Servant
 Veriano Ginesi as Geriel, the Ship's Drummer

Release
The Ten Gladiators was released in Italy on 14 December 1963 with a 110-minute running time as I dieci gladiatori. On its American release, the film had a running time of 104 minutes.

References

Footnotes

Sources

External links 
 
 

1963 films
1960s action adventure films
Peplum films
1960s Italian-language films
Films set in the Roman Empire
Depictions of Nero on film
Cultural depictions of Poppaea Sabina
Films about gladiatorial combat
Italian action adventure films
Sword and sandal films
1960s Italian films